Hanser Joel Alberto Peña (born October 17, 1992) is a Dominican professional baseball infielder in the Chicago White Sox organization. He has played in Major League Baseball (MLB) for the Texas Rangers, Baltimore Orioles, Kansas City Royals, and Los Angeles Dodgers.

Career

Texas Rangers
Alberto signed as an international free agent with the Texas Rangers in November 2009, receiving a $75,000 signing bonus. Playing for the Dominican Summer Rangers of the Rookie-level Dominican Summer League in 2010, he won the batting title. Alberto began the 2013 season with the Frisco RoughRiders of the Class AA Texas League, but struggled, and was demoted to the Myrtle Beach Pelicans of the Class A-Advanced Carolina League. He returned to Frisco in 2014, and won the Rawlings Minor League Gold Glove Award as the best defensive shortstop in minor league baseball.

The Rangers promoted Alberto to the major leagues on May 28, 2015; he made his debut the next day against the Boston Red Sox. He went 1-for-3 with a run batted in (RBI) triple in his debut. He made the Rangers postseason roster and batted .200 with two RBIs in the 2015 American League Division Series against the Toronto Blue Jays, including recording the game winning RBI in Game 2 of that series. He split the 2016 season between the Round Rock Express and Texas. Alberto playing in only five games in 2017 due to shoulder injuries. On December 14, 2017, Alberto signed a minor league contract with the Rangers. He split the 2018 season between the Rangers and Round Rock.

Baltimore Orioles
Alberto bounced around and was claimed off waivers several times during the offseason following the 2018 campaign. Alberto was claimed from the Rangers by the New York Yankees on November 2, 2018, but was then designated for assignment on January 11, 2019, as a result of the Yankees re-signing Zack Britton. A few hours later, the Orioles claimed him off waivers, but on February 19, the team designated him for assignment to make room for Josh Osich. Three days later, on February 22, he was claimed by the San Francisco Giants, but after only a week with the team, he rejoined the Orioles on March 1.

Alberto was pressed into service as a relief pitcher in the ninth inning of a 15–3 loss to the New York Yankees at Camden Yards on April 7, 2019. With the score 13–3, he hit a batter, surrendered a two-run homer, walked a pair and got a force out and two flyouts. He joined teammates Renato Núñez and Anthony Santander as the third Oriole within a three-week span to achieve his own first-ever five-hit game in a 14–2 win over the Kansas City Royals at Kauffman Stadium on August 30, 2019. This occurred within a calendar month for the first time since Wally Moses, Frankie Hayes and Lou Finney did it with the Philadelphia Athletics in July 1936.

Alberto enjoyed a career year offensively, hitting .305/.329/.422 with 12 home runs and 51 runs batted in. He had the lowest strikeout percentage in baseball (9.1%), led the majors in at bats per strikeout (10.5), and led the American League in bunt hits (9). 
He also swung at the highest percentage of pitches outside the strike zone of all American League batters (47.6%), and had the lowest Hard Contact Percentage of all major league batters, at 24.6%.

In 2020 for the Orioles, Alberto slashed .283/.306/.393 with 3 home runs and 22 RBI. He was non-tendered by the Orioles on December 2, 2020 and was released the same day. He had been expected to get a $2–4 million raise in his first year of arbitration eligibility.

Kansas City Royals
On January 31, 2021, Alberto signed a minor league contract with the Kansas City Royals organization. On March 29, 2021, Alberto was selected to the 40-man roster. Alberto played in 103 games for the Royals, hitting .270 with 2 home runs and 24 RBI's. On October 29, Alberto elected free agency.

Los Angeles Dodgers
On March 23, 2022, Alberto signed a one-year contract for $1.6 million with the Los Angeles Dodgers. The deal contained a $2 million option for 2023. Alberto played every infield position plus right field, appearing in 73 games and batting .244 with two homers and 15 RBIs.  He also pitched in 10 games, allowing five runs in 11 innings and setting a major league record for most pitching appearances by a position player in a season. On November 8, 2022, the Dodgers declined Alberto's 2023 option, making him a free agent.

Chicago White Sox
On January 11, 2023, Alberto signed a minor league contract with the Chicago White Sox organization.

References

External links

1992 births
Living people
Baltimore Orioles players
Dominican Republic expatriate baseball players in the United States
Dominican Summer League Rangers players
Gigantes del Cibao players
Frisco RoughRiders players
Hickory Crawdads players
Kansas City Royals players
Los Angeles Dodgers players
Major League Baseball infielders
Major League Baseball players from the Dominican Republic
Myrtle Beach Pelicans players
People from San Francisco de Macorís
Round Rock Express players
Spokane Indians players
Surprise Saguaros players
Texas Rangers players